Eleanor Everest Freer (14 May 1864 – 13 Dec 1942) was an American composer and philanthropist.

Life
Eleanor Everest was born in Philadelphia, the daughter of Cornelius Everest and Ellen Amelia (Clark) Everest, and studied singing in Paris with Mathilde Marchesi and composition with Benjamin Godard. She taught music in Philadelphia and New York City, and married Chicago doctor Archibald Freer in 1893. The couple had one daughter and moved to Chicago in 1899, where Eleanor Freer studied music theory with Bernard Ziehn. In 1934, she received a D.Mus. from the Boguslawski College of Music. She died in Chicago in 1942.

Freer was an active advocate for American opera, and opera sung in English. To this end, she helped to found the Opera in Our Language Foundation (OOLF) in 1921, and the David Bispham Memorial Fund in 1922 to promote concerts of American composers' works and award a Bispham Medal. The two organizations merged in 1924 to become the American Opera Society of Chicago. She died in Chicago in 1942.

Freer's one act opera The Legend of the Piper was performed numerous times by the American Opera Company from 1928 through 1929.

Works
Freer composed eleven operas and more than 150 songs, many of which were published in collections. Selected works include:
A Book of Songs, op. 4 (9 songs)
Five Songs to Spring
Four Songs
Six Songs to Nature
Sonnets from the Portuguese (44 songs)
The Brownings Go to Italy
 Massimiliano, or The Court Jester, Romantic Opera in One Act
The Legend of the Piper opera
Little Women opera

References

External links

1864 births
1942 deaths
19th-century classical composers
20th-century classical composers
American women classical composers
American classical composers
American opera composers
Musicians from Philadelphia
Pupils of Bernhard Ziehn
19th-century American composers
Women opera composers
20th-century American women musicians
20th-century American composers
19th-century American women musicians
Classical musicians from Pennsylvania
20th-century women composers
19th-century women composers